Prai (Phray) or Phai, also known as Thin (Htin), is a Mon–Khmer language of Thailand and Laos. There are several closely related, but not mutually intelligible dialects which go by the names Prai and Thin. They are also closely related to Mal, together forming the Mal–Phrai group of languages, sometimes collectively called Lua' language (because they are spoken by the Lua people).

Phonology 

All vowels can be long or short.

References

Khmuic languages
Languages of Thailand
Languages of Laos